Ancistomus is a genus of suckermouth armored catfishes found in shallow waters in rapidly flowing rivers in the southeastern Amazon basin in Brazil.

Species
There are currently 5 recognized species in this genus:
 Ancistomus feldbergae R. R. de Oliveira, Rapp Py-Daniel, Zuanon & M. S. Rocha, 2012
 Ancistomus micrommatos A. R. Cardoso & P. H. F. Lucinda, 2003
 Ancistomus snethlageae Steindachner, 1911
 Ancistomus spilomma A. R. Cardoso & P. H. F. Lucinda, 2003
 Ancistomus spinosissimus A. R. Cardoso & P. H. F. Lucinda, 2003

References

Fish of South America
Hypostominae